Małgorzata Piekarska called : Małgosia, was born in 1954 in Poland. She was cast in four movies during the late 1950s and early 1960s, among which her most popular role is the one in "Awantura o Basię" movie from 1959. At those times, Piekarska did couple of "kind-of social commercials". Currently, she's been living and working in Australia.

Filmography 
1963 - Kryptonim nektar 
1960 - Szatan z siódmej klasy 
1960 - Marysia i krasnoludki 
1959 - Awantura o Basię

External links
Pictures

IBFP

Polish child actresses
1954 births
Living people